Karen Marisa Gorham,  (born 24 June 1964) is a British Church of England bishop. Since February 2016, she has been the Bishop of Sherborne, a suffragan bishop in the Diocese of Salisbury; and she was Acting Bishop of Salisbury from 2021 to 2022. From 2007 to 2016, she was the Archdeacon of Buckingham in the Diocese of Oxford.

Early life and education
Gorham was born on 24 June 1964. She was educated at Mayflower High School, a state school in Billericay, Essex. She studied for a Bachelor of Arts degree at the University of Bristol and graduated in 1995. She trained for ordained ministry at Trinity College, Bristol, an Anglican theological college in the evangelical tradition.

Ordained ministry
Gorham was ordained in the Church of England as a deacon at Petertide 1995 (2 July) by John Habgood, Archbishop of York, at York Minster, and as a priest in 1996. From 1995 to 1999, she served her curacy in the parish of Northallerton with Kirby Sigston in the Diocese of York.

Gorham then moved to the Diocese of Canterbury and was priest in charge of St Paul's Church, Maidstone, from 1999 to 2007. She additionally held two appointments during this time, as the Assistant Director of Ordinands from 2002 and the Area Dean of Maidstone from 2003. In 2006, she was appointed an honorary canon of Canterbury Cathedral.

In 2007, Gorham moved to the Diocese of Oxford to become the new Archdeacon of Buckingham. On 6 October 2007, she was inaugurated as archdeacon at All Saints' Church, High Wycombe, by Alan Wilson, Bishop of Buckingham. She stepped down as archdeacon on 19 January 2016 in preparation for her consecration to the episcopate.

Episcopal ministry
On 26 November 2015, it was announced that Gorham was to be next Bishop of Sherborne, a suffragan bishop in the Diocese of Salisbury. On 24 February 2016, she was consecrated a bishop by Justin Welby, Archbishop of Canterbury, at Westminster Abbey. On 6 March 2016, she was welcomed into the diocese during a service at Sherborne Abbey. In the vacancy following Nick Holtam's retirement on 3 July 2021, Gorham additionally served as acting diocesan bishop (Acting Bishop of Salisbury) until Stephen Lake was inaugurated on 19 June 2022.

Publications
 with Dave Leal.

Honours
In 2012, Gorham was elected a Fellow of the Royal Society of Arts (FRSA).

Styles

The Reverend Karen Gorham (1995–2006)
The Reverend Canon Karen Gorham (2006–2007)
The Venerable Karen Gorham (2007-2016)
The Right Reverend Karen Gorham (2016–present)

Notes

References

1964 births
Living people
Alumni of Trinity College, Bristol
Archdeacons of Buckingham
Alumni of the University of Bristol
Bishops of Sherborne
Women Anglican bishops
20th-century English Anglican priests
21st-century English Anglican priests